Bhairanayakanahalli is a village of Nelamangala subdistrict, Bangalore Rural district in the state of Karnataka, India. It is located about 40 km north-west of Bangalore. In 2011, the population was 1050 with 596 males and 454 females.

The Bhairanayakanahalli Halt Railway Station is a connecting place for surrounding villages like Chikkahalli, Kamasandra, Vadagere, Kenjiganahalli, Hasurahalli, Baradi, etc.

References 

Villages in Bangalore Rural district